Visage is the name of a compilation EP by the British band Visage, released in July 1981 by Polydor Records.

Background
The 5-track EP was released only in the U.S. and Canada, and featured extended dance mixes of "Fade to Grey", "Frequency 7" and "We Move", the latter two being the B-sides of the "Mind of a Toy" 12" single. Two other tracks were also included, "Blocks on Blocks" and "Tar", both from Visage's debut album.

Track listing
A1. "We Move" (Dance Mix) – 6:28
A2. "Frequency 7" (Dance Mix) – 5:03
B1. "Blocks on Blocks" – 3:56
B2. "Fade to Grey" (Dance Mix) – 6:44
B3. "Tar" – 3:31

References

1981 debut EPs
Albums produced by Midge Ure
Polydor Records albums
Visage (band) albums